The CWA World Tag Team Championship was the tag team professional wrestling title in the German professional wrestling promotion the Catch Wrestling Association. It was established in 1988, and lasted until the promotion's 2000 closing. The championship was contested under two out of three falls.

Title history
Key

Footnotes

References

Catch Wrestling Association championships
Tag team wrestling championships